The Alaska Purchase was the United States' acquisition of Alaska from the Russian Empire. Alaska was formally transferred to the United States on October 18, 1867, through a treaty ratified by the United States Senate.

Russia had established a presence in North America during the first half of the 18th century, but few Russians ever settled in Alaska. In the aftermath of the Crimean War, Russian Tsar Alexander II began exploring the possibility of selling Alaska, which would be difficult to defend in any future war from being conquered by Russia's archrival, the United Kingdom of Great Britain and Ireland. Following the end of the American Civil War, U.S. Secretary of State William Seward entered into negotiations with Russian minister Eduard de Stoeckl for the purchase of Alaska. Seward and Stoeckl agreed to a treaty on March 30, 1867, and the treaty was ratified by the United States Senate by a wide margin.

The purchase added  of new territory to the United States for the cost of $7.2 million in 1867. In modern terms, the cost was equivalent to $ million in  dollars or $ per acre. Reactions to the purchase in the United States were mostly positive, as many believed possession of Alaska would serve as a base to expand American trade in Asia. Some opponents labeled the purchase as "Seward's Folly", or "Seward's Icebox", as they contended that the United States had acquired useless land. Nearly all Russian settlers left Alaska in the aftermath of the purchase; Alaska would remain sparsely populated until the Klondike Gold Rush began in 1896. Originally organized as the Department of Alaska, the area was renamed the District of Alaska (1884) and the Alaska Territory (1912) before becoming the modern State of Alaska in 1959.

History

Russian America was settled by promyshlenniki, merchants and fur trappers who expanded through Siberia. They arrived in Alaska in 1732, and in 1799 the Russian-American Company (RAC) received a charter to hunt for fur. No colony was established, but the Russian Orthodox Church sent missionaries to the natives and built churches. About 700 Russians enforced sovereignty in a territory over twice as large as Texas. In 1821, Tsar Alexander I issued an edict declaring Russia's sovereignty over the North American Pacific coast north of the 51st parallel north. The edict also forbade foreign ships to approach within 100 Italian miles (115 miles or 185 km) of the Russian claim. US Secretary of State John Quincy Adams strongly protested the edict, which potentially threatened both the commerce and expansionary ambitions of the United States. Seeking favorable relations with the U.S., Alexander agreed to the Russo-American Treaty of 1824. In the treaty, Russia limited its claims to lands north of parallel 54°40′ north, and also agreed to open Russian ports to U.S. ships.

By the 1850s a population of once 300,000 sea otters was almost extinct, and Russia needed money after being defeated by France and Britain in the Crimean War. The California Gold Rush showed that if gold were discovered in Alaska, Americans and British Canadians would overwhelm the Russian presence in what one scholar later described as "Siberia's Siberia". However, the principal reason for the sale was that the hard-to-defend colony would be easily conquered by British forces based in neighboring Canada in any future conflict, and Russia did not wish to see its archrival being next door just across the Bering Sea. Therefore, Emperor Alexander II decided to sell the territory. The Russian government discussed the proposal in 1857 and 1858, and offered to sell the territory to the United States, hoping that its presence in the region would offset the plans of Britain. However, no deal was reached, as the risk of an American Civil War was a more pressing concern in Washington.

Grand Duke Konstantin, a younger brother of the Tsar, began to press for the handover of Russian America to the United States in 1857. In a memorandum to Foreign Minister Alexander Gorchakov he stated that 

Konstantin's letter was shown to his brother, Tsar Alexander II, who wrote "this idea is worth considering" on the front page. Supporters of Konstantin's proposal to immediately withdraw from North America included Admiral Yevfimy Putyatin and the Russian minister to the United States, Eduard de Stoeckl. Gorchakov agreed with the necessity of abandoning Russian America but argued for a gradual process leading to its sale. He found a supporter in the naval minister and former chief manager of the Russian-American Company, Ferdinand von Wrangel. Wrangel pressed for some proceeds to be invested in the economic development of Kamchatka and the Amur Basin. The Emperor eventually sided with Gorchakov, deciding to postpone negotiations until the end of the RAC's patent, set to expire in 1861.

Over the winter of 1859–1860, Stoeckl held meetings with United States officials, though he had been instructed not to initiate discussions about the sale of the RAC assets. Communicating primarily with Assistant Secretary of State John Appleton and California Senator William M. Gwin, Stoeckl reported the interest expressed by the Americans in acquiring Russian America. While President James Buchanan kept these hearings informal, preparations were made for further negotiations. Stoeckl reported a conversation in which he asked "in passing" what price the U.S. government might pay for the Russian colony and Senator Gwin replied that they "might go as far as $5,000,000", a figure Gorchakov found far too low. Stoeckl informed Appleton and Gwin of this, the latter saying that his Congressional colleagues in Oregon and California would support a larger figure. Buchanan's increasingly unpopular presidency forced the matter to be shelved until a new presidential election. With the oncoming American Civil War, Stoeckl proposed a renewal of the RAC's charter. Two of its ports were to be open to foreign traders and commercial agreements with Peru and Chile to be signed to give "a fresh jolt" to the company.

Russia continued to see an opportunity to weaken British power by causing British Columbia, including the Royal Navy base at Esquimalt, to be surrounded or annexed by American territory. Following the Union victory in the Civil War in 1865, the Tsar instructed Stoeckl to re-enter into negotiations with William H. Seward in the beginning of March 1867. President Andrew Johnson was busy with negotiations about Reconstruction, and Seward had alienated a number of Republicans, so both men believed that the purchase would help divert attention from domestic issues. The negotiations concluded after an all-night session with the signing of the treaty at 04:00 on March 30, 1867. The purchase price was set at $7.2 million ($ million in ), or about 2 cents per acre ($4.74/km2).

American ownership
The name "Alaska" was chosen by the Americans, from an Aleut word, alashka or alaesksu, meaning "great land" or "mainland". In the Russian era, the name had been used for the Alaska Peninsula, which the Russians had called Alyaska ("Аляска") or Alyeska.

Seward and many other Americans believed that Asia would become an important market for the country's products, and expected that Alaska would serve as a base for American trade with Asia and globally and for American power in the Pacific. While agreeing with Seward about the benefit to trade, Senator Charles Sumner was unusual in expecting that the territory would be valuable on its own; having studied the records of explorers, he believed that it contained valuable animals and forests. He compared the acquisition to contemporary European colonialism, such as the French conquest of Algeria. As chair of the Foreign Relations Committee, he sponsored the bill to acquire the territory. Seward told the nation that the Russians estimated that Alaska contained about 2,500 Russians and those of mixed race (that is, a Russian father and native mother), and 8,000 indigenous people, in all about 10,000 people under the direct government of the Russian fur company, and possibly 50,000 Inuit and Alaska Natives living outside its jurisdiction. The Russians were settled at 23 trading posts, placed at accessible islands and coastal points. At smaller stations, only four or five Russians were stationed to collect furs from the natives for storage and shipment when the company's boats arrived to take it away. There were two larger towns. New Archangel, now named Sitka, had been established in 1804 to handle the valuable trade in the skins of the sea otter and in 1867 contained 116 small log cabins with 968 residents. St. Paul in the Pribilof Islands had 100 homes and 283 people and was the center of the seal fur industry. The treaty passed the United States Senate with 37 votes for versus 2 opposed.

Public opinion favors the purchase
Many Americans believed in 1867 that the purchase process had been corrupt, but W. H. Dall in 1872 wrote that, "there can be no doubt that the feelings of a majority of the citizens of the United States are in favor of it." The notion that the purchase was unpopular among Americans is, a scholar wrote 120 years later, "one of the strongest historical myths in American history. It persists despite conclusive evidence to the contrary, and the efforts of the best historians to dispel it", likely in part because it fits American and Alaskan writers' view of the territory as distinct and filled with self-reliant pioneers.

A majority of newspapers supported the purchase or were neutral.  A review of dozens of contemporary newspapers found general support for the purchase, especially in California; most of 48 major newspapers supported the purchase. Public opinion was not universally positive; to some the purchase was known as "Seward's folly", "Walrussia", or "Seward's icebox". Editorials contended that taxpayer money had been wasted on a "Polar bear garden". Nonetheless, most newspaper editors argued that the U.S. would probably derive great economic benefits from the purchase, such as considerable mineral resources that previous geological explorations of the region suggested were available there; friendship with Russia was important; and it would facilitate the acquisition of British Columbia. Forty-five percent of supportive newspapers cited the increased potential for annexing British Columbia in their support, and The New York Times stated that, consistent with Seward's reason, Alaska would increase American trade with East Asia.

The principal urban newspaper that opposed the purchase was the New York Tribune, published by Seward opponent Horace Greeley. The ongoing controversy over Reconstruction spread to other acts, such as the Alaska purchase. Some opposed the United States obtaining its first non-contiguous territory, seeing it as a colony; others saw no need to pay for land that they expected the country to obtain through manifest destiny. Historian Ellis Paxson Oberholtzer summarized the minority opinion of some American newspaper editors who opposed the purchase:

Transfer ceremony

The transfer ceremony took place in Sitka on October 18, 1867. Russian and American soldiers paraded in front of the governor's house; the Russian flag was lowered and the American flag raised amid peals of artillery.

A description of the events was published in Finland six years later. It was written by a blacksmith named Thomas Ahllund, who had been recruited to work in Sitka:

After the flag transition was completed, Captain of 2nd Rank Aleksei Alekseyevich Peshchurov said, "General Rousseau, by authority from His Majesty, the Emperor of Russia, I transfer to the United States the territory of Alaska." General Lovell Rousseau accepted the territory. (Peshchurov had been sent to Sitka as commissioner of the Russian government in the transfer of Alaska.) A number of forts, blockhouses and timber buildings were handed over to the Americans. The troops occupied the barracks; General Jefferson C. Davis established his residence in the governor's house, and most of the Russian citizens went home, leaving a few traders and priests who chose to remain.

Aftermath
After the transfer, a number of Russian citizens remained in Sitka, but nearly all of them very soon decided to return to Russia, which was still possible at the expense of the Russian-American Company. Ahllund's story "corroborates other accounts of the transfer ceremony, and the dismay felt by many of the Russians and creoles, jobless and in want, at the rowdy troops and gun-toting civilians who looked on Sitka as merely one more western frontier settlement." Ahllund gives a vivid account of what life was like for civilians in Sitka under US rule and helps to explain why hardly any Russian subject wanted to stay there. Moreover, Ahllund's article is the only known description of the return voyage on the Winged Arrow, a ship that was specially purchased to transport the Russians back to their native country. "The over-crowded vessel, with crewmen who got roaring drunk at every port, must have made the voyage a memorable one." Ahllund mentions stops at the Sandwich (Hawaiian) Islands, Tahiti, Brazil, London, and finally Kronstadt, the port for St. Petersburg, where they arrived on August 28, 1869.

American settlers who shared Sumner's belief in the riches of Alaska rushed to the territory but found that much capital was required to exploit its resources, many of which could also be found closer to markets in the contiguous United States. Most soon left, and by 1873, Sitka's population had declined from about 2,500 to a few hundred. The United States acquired an area over twice as large as Texas, but it was not until the great Klondike Gold Rush in 1896 that Alaska generally came to be seen as a valuable addition to U.S. territory.

The seal fishery was one of the chief considerations that induced the United States to purchase Alaska. It provided considerable revenue by the lease of the privilege of taking seals, an amount that was eventually more than the price paid for Alaska. From 1870 to 1890, the seal fisheries yielded 100,000 skins a year. The company to which the administration of the fisheries was entrusted by a lease from the US government paid a rental of $50,000 per annum and in addition thereto $2.62½ per skin for the total number taken. The skins were transported to London to be dressed and prepared for world markets. The business grew so large that the earnings of English laborers after the acquisition of Alaska by the United States amounted by 1890 to $12,000,000.

However, exclusive US control of this resource was eventually challenged, and the Bering Sea Controversy resulted when the United States seized over 150 sealing ships flying the British flag, based out of the coast of British Columbia. The conflict between the United States and Britain was resolved by an arbitration tribunal in 1893. The waters of the Bering Sea were deemed to be international waters, contrary to the US contention that they were an internal sea. The US was required to make a payment to Britain, and both nations were required to follow regulations developed to preserve the resource.

Financial return
The purchase of Alaska has been referenced as a "bargain basement deal" and as the principal positive accomplishment of the presidency of Andrew Johnson.

Economist David R. Barker has argued that the US federal government has not earned a positive financial return on the purchase of Alaska. According to Barker, tax revenue and mineral and energy royalties to the federal government have been less than federal costs of governing Alaska plus interest on the borrowed funds used for the purchase.

John M. Miller has taken the argument further by contending that US oil companies that developed Alaskan petroleum resources did not earn enough profits to compensate for the risks that they incurred.

Other economists and scholars, including Scott Goldsmith and Terrence Cole, have criticized the metrics used to reach those conclusions by noting that most contiguous Western states would fail to meet the bar of "positive financial return" using the same criteria and by contending that looking at the increase in net national income, instead of only US Treasury revenue, would paint a much more accurate picture of the financial return of Alaska as an investment.

Alaska Day
Alaska Day celebrates the formal transfer of Alaska from Russia to the United States, which took place on October 18, 1867. The date is by the Gregorian calendar and a clock time 9:01:20 behind Greenwich (local mean time), which came into effect in Alaska the following day to replace the Julian calendar, which was used by the Russians (the Julian calendar in the 19th century was 12 days behind the Gregorian calendar), and a clock time 14:58:40 ahead of Greenwich. Alaska Day is a holiday for all state workers.

See also
 Florida Purchase
 Gadsden Purchase 
 Louisiana Purchase

Notes

References

Sources
 
 Bancroft, Hubert Howe: History of Alaska: 1730–1885 (1886).
 
 Farrow, Lee A. Seward's Folly: A New Look at the Alaska Purchase (University of Alaska Press, 2016). xiv, 225 pp. 
 
 
 
 Kushner, Howard. "The significance of the Alaska purchase to American expansion." in S. Frederick Starr, ed., Russia's American Colony. (1987): 295–315.
 Pierce, Richard: Russian America: A Biographical Dictionary, p. 395. Alaska History no. 33, The Limestone Press; Kingston, Ontario & Fairbanks, Alaska, 1990.
 
 
  online

Primary sources
  (Originally published in Finnish in Suomen Kuvalehti (editor-in-chief Julius Krohn) No. 15/1873 (1 August) – No. 19/1873 (1 October)); firsthand account of the transfer
 Seward, William H. Alaska: Speech of William H. Seward at Sitka, August 12, 1869 (1869; Digitized page images & text), a primary source

External links

 Treaty with Russia for the Purchase of Alaska and related resources at the Library of Congress
 Meeting of Frontiers, Library of Congress
  Program featuring the purchase check cashed for gold at Riggs Bank (17:00 minute mark).
 Original Document of Check to Purchase Alaska (registration required)

1867 in Alaska
1867 in the Russian Empire
1867 in the United States
1867 treaties
Aboriginal title in the United States
Colonial United States (Russian)
History of the American West
History of United States expansionism
March 1867 events
Russian America
Russian Empire–United States relations
Treaties involving territorial changes
Treaties of the Russian Empire
Bilateral treaties of the United States
Purchased territories
Territorial evolution of Russia
Bilateral treaties of Russia
Presidency of Andrew Johnson
Pre-statehood history of Alaska
Alexander II of Russia